

U

 

Uakitite (nitride, rocksalt: IMA2018-003) 1.0  [no] [no]
Uchucchacuaite (lillianite: IMA1981-007) 2.JB.40a    (AgMnPb3Sb5S12)
Udinaite (IMA2018-066) 8.0  [no] [no] (IUPAC: sodium tetramagnesium trivanadate)
UdumineliteQ (Y: 1950) 8.DM.30  [no] [no]
Uedaite-(Ce) (epidote: IMA2006-022) 9.BG.05   
Uklonskovite (IMA1967 s.p., 1964) 7.DF.05    
Ulexite (Y: 1850) 6.EA.25    (IUPAC: sodium calcium hexahydro hexaoxopentaborate pentahydrate)
Ulfanderssonite-(Ce) (IMA2016-107) 9.0  [no] [no]
Ullmannite (ullmannite: 1843) 2.EB.25    (IUPAC: nickel sulfantimonide)
Ulrichite (IMA1988-006) 8.EA.15   
Ulvöspinel (spinel, spinel: 1946) 4.BB.05    (IUPAC: diiron(II) titanum tetraoxide)
Umangite (Y: 1891) 2.BA.25    (IUPAC: tricopper diselenide)
Umbite (umbite: IMA1982-006) 9.DG.25   
Umbozerite (IMA1973-039) 9.HG.15   
Umbrianite (phyllosilicate: IMA2011-074) 9.E?.  [no] [no]
Umohoite (Y: 1953) 4.GC.10    (IUPAC: uranyl molybdate dihydrate)
Ungavaite (IMA2004-020) 2.AC.35b    (IUPAC: tetrapalladium triantimonide)
Ungemachite (Y: 1938) 7.DG.10    (IUPAC: tripotassium octasodium iron(III) hexasulfate dinitrate hexahydrate)
Upalite (IMA1978-045) 8.EC.05    (IUPAC: aluminium triuranyl oxyhydro diphosphate heptahydrate)
Uralborite (Y: 1961, 1967 s.p.) 6.DA.35    (IUPAC: calcium tetrahydro dioxodiborate)
Uralolite (Y: 1964) 8.DA.15   
Uramarsite (meta-autunite: IMA2005-043) 8.EB.15    (IUPAC: ammonium uranyl arsenate trihydrate)
Uramphite (natroautunite: 1957) 8.EB.15    (IUPAC: ammonium uranyl phosphate trihydrate)
Urancalcarite (IMA1983-052) 5.EA.10    (IUPAC: calcium triuranyl hexahydro carbonate trihydrate)
Uranoclite (IMA2020-074) 4.0  [no] [no]
Uraninite (fluorite: 1845) 4.DL.05    (IUPAC: uranium dioxide)
Uranocircite (Y: 1877) 8.EB.05  [no] [no] (IUPAC: barium diuranyl diphosphate decahydrate)
Uranophane (Y: 1853) 9.AK.15    (IUPAC: calcium diuranyl di(hydrotrioxosilicate) pentahydrate)
Uranopilite (Y: 1882) 7.EA.05    (IUPAC: hexauranyl dioxyhexahydro sulfate tetradecahydrate)
Uranopolycrase (columbite: IMA1990-046) 4.DG.05   
Uranosilite (IMA1981-066) 9.AK.40   
Uranospathite (Y: 1915) 8.EB.25   
Uranosphaerite (Y: 1873) 4.GB.65    (IUPAC: bismuth uranyl hydro dioxide)
Uranospinite (Y: 1873) 8.EB.05    (IUPAC: calcium diuranyl diarsenate decahydrate)
Uranotungstite (IMA1984-005) 7.HB.25    (IUPAC: iron diuranyl tetrahydro tungstanate dodecahydrate)
Urea (IMA1972-031) 10.CA.35   
Uricite (IMA1973-055) 10.CA.40    (IUPAC: uric acid)
Uroxite (hydrous uranyl oxalate: IMA2018-100) 10.AB.  [no] [no]
Ursilite (Y: 1957) 9.AK.35   [no]
Urusovite (IMA1998-067) 8.BB.60   [no] (IUPAC: copper aluminium oxoarsenate)
Urvantsevite (IMA1976-025) 2.EB.30   
Ushkovite (laueite, laueite: IMA1982-014) 8.DC.30     (IUPAC: magnesium diiron(III) dihydro diphosphate octahydrate)
Usovite (IMA1966-038) 3.CB.35    (IUPAC: dibarium calcium magnesium tetradecafluorodialuminate)
Ussingite (Y: 1915) 9.EH.20   
UstarasiteQ (Y: 1955) 2.JB.40e   
Usturite (garnet: IMA2009-053) 4.0  [no] [no] (IUPAC: tricalcium (antimony zirconium) tri(iron(III) tetraoxide))
Utahite (tellurium oxysalt: IMA1995-039) 7.DE.25    (IUPAC: pentacopper trizinc octahydro tetra(tetraoxotellurate(VI)) heptahydrate)
UvaniteQ (Y: 1914) 4.HB.35   
Uvarovite (garnet, garnet: IMA1967 s.p., 1832) 9.AD.25    (IUPAC: tricalcium dichromium tri(tetraoxysilicate))
Uvite (tourmaline: IMA2019-113) 9.CK.  [no] [no]
Uytenbogaardtite (IMA1977-018) 2.BA.75    (IUPAC: trisilver gold disulfide)
Uzonite (IMA1984-027) 2.FA.25    (IUPAC: tetrarsenic pentasulfide)

V

Vaesite (pyrite: 1945) 2.EB.05a    (IUPAC: nickel disulfide)
Vajdakite (IMA1998-031) 4.JC.20   [no] (IUPAC: di(dioxomolybdate(VI)) diarsenic(III) pentaoxide trihydrate)
Valentinite (IMA1980 s.p., 1845) 4.CB.55    (IUPAC: diantimony trioxide)
Valleriite (valleriite: 1871) 2.FD.30   
Valleyite (sodalite: IMA2017-026) 4.0  [no] [no] (IUPAC: tetracalcium hexairon tridecaoxide)
Vanackerite (apatite: IMA2011-114) 8.0  [no] [no] (IUPAC: tetralead cadmium (chloro,hydro) triarsenate)
Vanadinite (apatite: 1838) 8.BN.05    (IUPAC: pentalead chloro trivanadate)
Vanadiocarpholite (carpholite: IMA2003-055) 9.DB.05   [no] (IUPAC: manganese(II) vanadium(III) aluminium hexaoxodisilicate tetrahydroxyl)
Vanadio-oxy-chromium-dravite (tourmaline: IMA2012-034) 9.CK.  [no] [no]
Vanadio-oxy-dravite (tourmaline: IMA2012-074) 9.CK.  [no] [no]
Vanadiopargasite (Ca-amphibole: IMA2017-019) 9.D  [no] [no]
Vanadium (iron: IMA2012-021a) 1.AE.  [no] [no]
Vanadoallanite-(La) (epidote: IMA2012-095) 9.B?.  [no] [no]
Vanadoandrosite-(Ce) (epidote, allanite: IMA2004-015) 9.BG.05   
Vanadomalayaite (titanite: IMA1993-032) 9.AG.15   [no] (IUPAC: calcium vanadium oxy(tetraoxysilicate))
Vanalite (IMA1967 s.p., 1962) 4.HG.15   
Vanarsite (polyoxometalate: IMA2014-031) 4.0  [no] [no]
Vandenbrandeite (Y: 1932) 4.GB.45    (IUPAC: copper uranyl tetrahydroxide)
Vandendriesscheite (Y: 1947) 4.GB.40   
Vanderheydenite (IMA2014-076) 8.0  [no] [no] (IUPAC: hexazinc diphosphate tetrahydro sulfate heptahydrate)
Vandermeerscheite (IMA2017-104) 8.0  [no] [no]
Vaniniite (IMA2017-116) 8.0  [no] [no]
Vanmeersscheite (IMA1981-009) 8.EC.20    
VanoxiteQ (Y: 1925) 4.HG.25    (IUPAC: tetravanadium(IV) divanadium(V) tridecaoxide octahydrate)
Vantasselite (IMA1986-016) 8.DC.37    (IUPAC: tetraluminium trihydro triphosphate nonahydrate)
Vanthoffite (Y: 1902) 7.AC.05    (IUPAC: hexasodium magnesium tetrasulfate)
Vanuralite (IMA1967 s.p., 1963) 4.HB.20    (IUPAC: aluminium diuranyl hydro divanadate (8.5)hydrate)
Vapnikite (double perovskite: IMA2013-082) 4.00.  [no]  (IUPAC: dicalcium calcium uranium hexaoxide)
Varennesite (IMA1994-017) 9.EE.50   [no]
Vargite (IMA2020-051) 8.DD.  [no] [no]
Variscite (IMA1967 s.p., 1837) 8.CD.10    (IUPAC: aluminium phosphate dihydrate)
VarlamoffiteQ (rutile: 1947) 4.DB.05  [no] [no] Note: possibly a variety of cassiterite.
Varulite (alluaudite: Rd 2019, 1937) 8.AC.10    (IUPAC: disodium manganese (manganese iron(III)) triphosphate) 
Vashegyite (Y: 1909) 8.DB.10    (IUPAC: undecaaluminium hexahydro nonaphosphate octatriacontahydrate)
Vasilite (IMA1989-044) 2.BC.25   
Vasilseverginite (IMA2015-083) 8.0  [no] [no] (IUPAC: nonacopper tetraoxodiarsenate disulfate)
Vasilyevite (IMA2003-016) 3.DD.45   [no] (IUPAC: deca(dimercury) hexaoxide triodine diboron chloro carbonate)
Västmanlandite-(Ce) (gatelite: IMA2002-025) 9.BG.55   [no]
Vaterite (IMA1962 s.p., 1911) 5.AB.20    (IUPAC: anhydrous calcium carbonate)
Vaughanite (IMA1987-055) 2.LA.20    (TlHgSb4S7)
Vauquelinite (Y: 1818) 7.FC.05    (IUPAC: copper dilead hydro chromate phosphate)
Vauxite (Y: 1922) 8.DC.35    (IUPAC: iron(II) dialumium dihydro diphosphate hexahydrate)
Vavřínite (IMA2005-045) 2.CC.30   [no] (IUPAC: dinickel antimonide ditelluride)
Väyrynenite (Y: 1954) 8.BA.05    (IUPAC: beryllium manganese(II) hydro phosphate)
Veatchite (Y: 1938) 6.EC.15   
Veblenite (veblenite (Si8O22) ribbon: IMA2010-050) 9.0  [no] [no]
Veenite (IMA1966-016) 2.HC.05d    (IUPAC: dilead diantimonide pentasulfide)
Velikite (stannite: IMA1996-052) 2.CB.15a    (IUPAC: dicopper mercury tetrasulfa stannide)
Vendidaite (IMA2012-089) 7.0  [no] [no] (IUPAC: dialuminium trihydro chloro sulfate hexahydrate)
Verbeekite (IMA2001-005) 2.EA.25    (IUPAC: lead diselenide)
Verbierite (humite: IMA2015-089) 4.0  [no] [no] (IUPAC: beryllium dichromium(III) titanium hexaoxide)
Vergasovaite (vergasovaite: IMA1998-009) 7.BB.30    (IUPAC: tricopper oxomolybdate sulfate)
Vermiculite (smectite-vermiculite: 1824) 9.EC.50   
VernaditeQ (Y: 1937) 4.FE.40    Note: possibly random-stacked birnessite.
Verneite (IMA2016-112) 3.0  [no] [no] (IUPAC: disodium tricalcium dialuminium tetradecafluoride)
Verplanckite (IMA1964-011) 9.CE.10   
Versiliaite (IMA1978-068) 4.JA.30   
Vertumnite (IMA1975-043) 9.EG.25   
Veselovskýite (lindackerite: IMA2005-053) 8.CE.30   [no]
Vésigniéite (Y: 1955) 8.BH.45    (IUPAC: tricopper barium dihydro divanadate)
Vestaite (IMA2017-068) 4.  [no] [no]
Vesuvianite (vesuvianite: IMA1962 s.p., 1795) 9.BG.35   
Veszelyite (Y: 1874) 8.DA.30    (IUPAC: di(copper,zinc) zinc trihydro phosphate dihydrate)
Viaeneite (IMA1993-051) 2.FD.10   
Vicanite-(Ce) (okanoganite: IMA1991-050) 9.AJ.35   [no]
Vigezzite (aeschnyite: IMA1977-008) 4.DF.05   
Vigrishinite (seidozerite, murmanite: IMA2011-073) 9.B?.  [no] 
Vihorlatite (IMA1988-047) 2.DC.05   [no] (Bi24Se17Te4)
Viitaniemiite (IMA1977-043) 8.BL.15    (IUPAC: sodium calcium aluminium trifluoro phosphate)
Vikingite (lillianite: IMA1976-006) 2.JB.40a    (Ag5Pb8Bi13S30)
Villamanínite (pyrite: IMA1989 s.p., 1920 Rd) 2.EB.05a    (IUPAC: copper disulfide)
Villiaumite (halite, rocksalt: 1908) 3.AA.20    (IUPAC: sodium fluoride)
Villyaellenite (hureaulite: IMA1983-008a) 8.CB.10   
Vimsite (IMA1968-034) 6.BC.15    (IUPAC: calcium dioxotetrahydro diborate)
Vincentite (IMA1973-051) 2.AC.05b    (IUPAC: tripalladium arsenide)
Vinciennite (IMA1983-031) 2.CB.35a    (Cu10Fe4SnAsS16)
Vinogradovite (Y: 1956) 9.DB.25   
Violarite (spinel, linnaeite: 1889) 2.DA.05    (IUPAC: iron(II) dinickel(III) tetrasulfide)
Virgilite (quartz: IMA1977-009) 9.FA.15   
Vishnevite (cancrinite: 1944) 9.FB.05    (IUPAC: octasodium (hexaluminohexasilicate) tetraicosaoxosulfate dihydrate)
Vismirnovite (schoenfliesite: IMA1980-029) 4.FC.10    (IUPAC: zinc tin hexahydroxide)
Vistepite (IMA1991-012) 9.BD.25    (IUPAC: tetramanganese tin dioxodiborate di(heptaoxodisilicate) dihydroxyl)
Viteite (IMA2019-040) 2.0  [no] [no]
Vitimite (IMA2001-057) 6.H0.45   [no] (IUPAC: hexacalcium [tetradecahydroxide|sulfate|nonadecaoxotetradecaborate] pentahydrate)
Vittinkiite (IMA2017-082a) 9.0  [no] [no] (MnMn3MnSi5O15)
Vitusite-(Ce) (IMA1976-055) 8.AC.35    (IUPAC: trisodium cerium diphosphate)
Vivianite (vivianite: 1817) 8.CE.40    (IUPAC: triiron(II) diphosphate octahydrate)
Vladimirite (IMA1964 s.p., 1953 Rd) 8.CJ.25    (IUPAC: tetracalcium diarsenate hydroxoarsenate(V) tetrahydrate)
Vladimirivanovite (sodalite: IMA2010-070) 9.FB.  [no] 
Vladkrivovichevite (IMA2011-020) 3.D?.  [no] 
Vladykinite (IMA2011-052) 9.0  [no] [no] (IUPAC: trisodium tetrastrontium (iron(II) iron(III)) tetraicosaoxyctasiliate)
Vlasovite (IMA1967 s.p., 1961) 9.DM.25    (IUPAC: disodium zirconium undecaoxotetrasilicate)
Vlodavetsite (IMA1993-023) 7.DF.40    (IUPAC: dicalcium aluminium difluoro chloro disulfate tetrahydrate)
Vochtenite (IMA1987-047) 8.EB.30   
Voggite (IMA1988-037) 8.DO.10    (IUPAC: disodium zirconium hydro phosphate carbonate dihydrate)
Voglite (Y: 1853) 5.EE.05    (IUPAC: dicalcium copper uranyl tetracarbonate hexahydrate)
Volaschioite (IMA2010-005) 7.DE.62  [no]  (IUPAC: tetrairon dioxohexahydro sulfate dihydrate)
Volborthite (IMA1968 s.p., 1838) 8.FD.05    (IUPAC: tricopper dihydro heptaoxodivanadate dihydrate)
Volkonskoite (montmorillonite, smectite: IMA1987 s.p., 1831 Rd) 9.EC.40   
Volkovskite (IMA1968 s.p., 1966) 6.EC.20   
Voloshinite (mica: IMA2007-052) 9.0   [no]
Voltaite (voltaite: 1841) 7.CC.25    (IUPAC: dipotassium pentairon(II) triiron(III) aluminium dodecasulfate octadecahydrate)
Volynskite (IMA1968 s.p., 1966) 2.JA.20    (IUPAC: silver bismuth ditelluride)
Vonbezingite (IMA1991-031) 7.DD.65    (IUPAC: hexacalcium tricopper dodecahydro trisulfate dihydrate)
Vonsenite (ludwigite: 1920) 6.AB.30    (IUPAC: diiron(II) iron(III) dioxo(trioxoborate))
Vorlanite (fluorite: IMA2009-032) 4.0  [no] [no]  (IUPAC: calcium uranium(VI) tetraoxide)
Voronkovite (eudialyte: IMA2007-023) 9.CO.10   [no]
Vorontsovite (tennantite: IMA2016-076) 2.0  [no] [no]  (IUPAC: (pentamercury copper) thallium dodecasulfa tetraarsenide)
Voudourisite (kieserite: IMA2012-042) 7.0  [no] [no]  (IUPAC: cadmium sulfate monohydrate)
Vozhminite (IMA1981-040) 2.BB.05    (IUPAC: tetranickel disulfarsenide)
Vránaite (anhydrous aluminoborosilicate: IMA2015-084) 9.0  [no] [no]
Vrbaite (Y: 1912) 2.HF.20    (Hg3Tl4As8Sb2S20)
Vuagnatite (adelite: IMA1975-007) 9.AG.60    (IUPAC: calcium aluminium hydrotetraoxysilicate)
Vulcanite (IMA1967 s.p., 1961) 2.CB.75    (IUPAC: copper(I) telluride)
Vuonnemite (seidozerite, lamprophyllite: IMA1973-015) 9.BE.35    (IUPAC: hexasodium disodium diniobium trisodium titanium di(heptaoxodisilicate) diphosphate dioxy(oxyfluoride))
Vuorelainenite (spinel, spinel: IMA1980-048) 4.BB.05    (IUPAC: manganese(II) divanadium(III) tetraoxide)
Vuoriyarvite-K (labuntsovite: IMA1995-031) 9.CE.30b   [no]
Vurroite (IMA2003-027) 2.JB.65   
Vyacheslavite (IMA1983-017) 8.DN.20    (IUPAC: diuranium(IV) dihydro diphosphate pentahydrate)
Vyalsovite (IMA1989-004) 2.FD.45    (IUPAC: calcium iron aluminium pentahydro sulfide)
Vymazalováite (IMA2016-105) 2.0  [no] [no] (IUPAC: trilead disulfa dibismuthide)
Vysokýite (IMA2012-067) 4.0  [no] [no] (IUPAC: uranium(IV) tetra(dihydroxoarsenate(V)) tetrahydrate)
Vysotskite (IMA1967 s.p., 1962) 2.CC.35a    (IUPAC: palladium sulfide)
Vyuntspakhkite-(Y) (IMA1982-040) 9.BG.40

External links
IMA Database of Mineral Properties/ RRUFF Project
Mindat.org - The Mineral Database
Webmineral.com
Mineralatlas.eu minerals U and V